The Jeanneau Yachts 53, or Jeanneau 53, is a French sailboat that was designed by Philippe Briand as a cruiser and first built in 2008. It was also sold as the Sunsail 53.

The design replaced the 2004 Sun Odyssey 54 DS in the company product line.

Production
The design was built by Jeanneau in France, starting in 2008, but it is now out of production.

Design
The Jeanneau Yachts 53 is a recreational keelboat, built predominantly of fiberglass, with wood trim. The deck has balsa panels for a core and is injection-molded. It has a fractional sloop rig, a nearly-plumb stem, a reverse transom with steps and a swimming platform, an internally mounted spade-type rudder controlled by dual wheels and a fixed fin keel or optional shoal-draft keel.

A tall rig "performance" version was also built, with a mast about  taller.

The design was available with several different interior arrangements, with two, three and four cabins. Depending on the number of cabins it has sleeping accommodation for four to eight people. Both the bow and stern may have one or two cabins, each with a double berth. The main salon has a "U"-shaped settee and a straight settee. The galley is located on the port side just forward of the companionway ladder and is "J"-shaped. A navigation station is opposite the galley, on the starboard side. Two to four heads may be installed, normally one for each cabin fitted. There is a large sail locker in the bow which can also be used as a crew cabin.

Operational history
In a 2010 review for Cruising World, Bill Springer wrote, "I think Jeanneau is on to something with its new line of yachts. The 53 is spacious, stylish, and sails well. The 57 has even more elbowroom, more sophisticated systems, larger battery capacity, and the dinghy “garage,” but both boats are designed to do the same thing: provide all the luxury of a big boat without the relatively big big-boat price tag."

In a 2017 review for Sail Magazine, Charles Doane wrote, "We sailed the 53 in open water off Miami Beach in 10-12 knots of wind. Our boat was equipped with an in-mast furling mainsail with no battens and a 125 percent genoa. Given the less-than-optimal main (in terms of performance) and the lack of proper downwind sails, I was pleasantly surprised by how well we did. We made our best speed to windward, about 6.5 knots, close-hauled at an apparent wind angle of about 40 degrees. Pinching a bit we could maintain 5.4 knots at an angle of 35 degrees. On a broad reach we hit 5.3 knots in spite of the reduced apparent wind."

See also
List of sailing boat types

References

Keelboats
2000s sailboat type designs
Sailing yachts
Sailboat type designs by Philippe Briand
Sailboat types built by Jeanneau